Arnaud Costes (born 16 June 1973 in Tulle, France) is a French former international rugby union footballer who also played for France national team.

Career 
As flanker he played for several French clubs: he debuted in the French championship in 1993 with Montferrand, where he also won the 1998-99 European Challenge Cup; in 2000 he moved to Castres for which he played until 2002; he then played the 2002-2003 season with Bourgoin-Jallieu then ended his professional career at Béziers (2003–2005).

Finally he moved at 34 to the amateur club Gaillac in Fédérale 3 where he closed definitely his career as player in 2007, aged 36.

As international he won 14 full caps for France and took part to two consecutive World Cups, in 1995 (1 match) and in 1999, where France were runners-up.
His last international game was against Ireland during the 2000 Six Nations.

Since retirement he has managed the amateur club Rugby Olympique de Castelnaudary, (Fédérale 3).

Honours

Club 
 European Challenge Cup winner (1999) with AS Montferrand

International 
 14 full caps, 1 try with France
 Runner-up at the 1999 Rugby World Cup

External links 
 Club stats from itsrugby.fr
International stats from scrum.com

1973 births
Living people
People from Tulle
French rugby union players
French rugby union coaches
Rugby union flankers
France international rugby union players
Sportspeople from Corrèze
ASM Clermont Auvergne players
Castres Olympique players
CS Bourgoin-Jallieu players
AS Béziers Hérault players